Deerfield Township may refer to the following places in the United States:

Illinois
 Deerfield Township, Fulton County, Illinois
 Deerfield Township, Lake County, Illinois, former name of Moraine Township, until 1998

Iowa
 Deerfield Township, Chickasaw County, Iowa

Kansas
 Deerfield Township, Kearny County, Kansas

Michigan
 Deerfield Township, Isabella County, Michigan
 Deerfield Township, Lapeer County, Michigan
 Deerfield Township, Lenawee County, Michigan
 Deerfield Township, Livingston County, Michigan
 Deerfield Township, Mecosta County, Michigan

Minnesota
 Deerfield Township, Cass County, Minnesota
 Deerfield Township, Steele County, Minnesota

Missouri
 Deerfield Township, Vernon County, Missouri

New Jersey
 Deerfield Township, New Jersey

Ohio
 Deerfield Township, Hamilton County, Ohio, a former township
 Deerfield Township, Morgan County, Ohio
 Deerfield Township, Portage County, Ohio
 Deerfield Township, Ross County, Ohio
 Deerfield Township, Warren County, Ohio

Pennsylvania
 Deerfield Township, Tioga County, Pennsylvania
 Deerfield Township, Warren County, Pennsylvania

See also
 Upper Deerfield Township, New Jersey
 West Deerfield Township, Lake County, Illinois
 Deerfield (disambiguation)

Township name disambiguation pages